John Schultz (born 28 September 1938) is a former Australian rules footballer who represented  in the Victorian Football League (VFL).

He had been a champion high-jumper at Caulfield Grammar School, winning the senior high jump at the 1955 Associated Grammar Schools Combined Athletics Meeting (as had South Melbourne's Jim Taylor in 1948). He also played for the school's First XVIII, a team which also contained other future VFL players, Ron Evans of Essendon and Ron Cabble of Hawthorn.

VFL career
Schultz was recruited by Footscray from country side Boort, having previously played briefly with Caulfield Grammarians Football Club in the Victorian Amateur Football Association (he broke his arm at the opening bounce of the first Caulfield Grammarians' practice match of the 1956 season).

Schultz was considered a "gentle giant", known as much for his fairness as for his brilliance.  An effective knock ruckman, he was acclaimed for good tackling, elegant marking and hard, fair bumping. Roy Wright, another "gentle giant" and Brownlow medallist, helped him early in his career: "after lining up on Roy Wright in one of my first matches, he came to the dressing rooms after the match and gave me a few hints on things I did and didn't do right". Compared with others of his day, Schultz had exceptional stamina and he seemed to be able to run just as quickly at the end of a match as he had at its beginning.

Schultz won the Brownlow Medal in 1960 (when only 21 years old) by one vote from 's Kevin Murray. He was Footscray's best and fairest player five times (1960, 1962, 1964–66). Schultz played for Victoria 21 times, and was an All-Australian in 1961.

In 1961, Footscray, playing a fast game using the soon-to-be-outlawed "flick pass", won through to their second Grand Final, this time against , who were playing in their first Grand Final. On a hot day, in front of over 100,000 spectators, the Hawks, dubbed Kennedy's Commandos for their fanatical approach to fitness, overran the Bulldogs in the second half to claim their first VFL premiership.

Schultz played as an amateur. He played his entire VFL with the great Ted Whitten as his captain, and retired in 1968, aged only twenty-nine, to help manage the family grocery business.

His younger brother Robert, also from Caulfield Grammar School, played two senior games for Footscray in 1963.

Post-VFL career
Fittingly for a man who was known for his fairness and never once reported, Schultz later served on the league tribunal. He once said, "I love nothing more than seeing someone shake another player's hand after a tough game – that's the ultimate in sportsmanship."
In 1996 Schultz was inducted into the Australian Football Hall of Fame with the following citation:
Rucking giant who never let the side down. Set the standard for the modern ruckman.

In 2002, Schultz was named in the back pocket of the Footscray/Western Bulldogs Team of the Century.

Schultz is still heavily involved at the Bulldogs, serving as a mentor to the playing group. He was given the honour of handing the Premiership cup to Easton Wood, Luke Beveridge and Robert Murphy after the Western Bulldogs won the 2016 AFL Grand Final.

Personal life
Schultz lives in Shoreham, a town on the Mornington Peninsula. He was married to Elaine, who came from Durham Ox, the town next to Boort, until she died in 2013.

See also
 List of Caulfield Grammar School people

Footnotes

References
 
 "New Boys" join the 200 club, The Age, (Tuesday, 3 December 1968), p.25.

External links 

 AFL: Hall of Fame

Australian rules footballers from Victoria (Australia)
People educated at Caulfield Grammar School
Western Bulldogs players
Brownlow Medal winners
Australian Football Hall of Fame inductees
All-Australians (1953–1988)
Charles Sutton Medal winners
1938 births
Living people